Melvin Russell Riebe (July 12, 1916 – July 25, 1977) was an American professional basketball player.

A 5'11" guard-forward who also played minor league baseball in the Cleveland Indians' organization, Riebe played professionally in both the National Basketball League (1943–1945) and the Basketball Association of America (1946–1949), finishing his career with two seasons with the Boston Celtics. He led the NBL in scoring twice, averaging 17.9 points per game during the 1943–44 season and 20.2 points per game the following year as a member of the Cleveland Chase Brassmen and the Cleveland Allmen Transfers.

From 1950 to 1954 he attended the College of Wooster, where he was ineligible to play basketball or baseball due to his professional experience but played on the golf team.  He spent the rest of his life as a football and basketball coach, athletic director, and physical education teacher at Waynedale High School in Apple Creek, Ohio.

Riebe's brother, Hank Riebe, was a catcher in Major League Baseball from 1942 to 1949.

BAA career statistics

Regular season

Playoffs

References

External links

1916 births
1977 deaths
American men's basketball players
Basketball coaches from Ohio
Basketball players from Cleveland
Boston Celtics players
Cleveland Allmen Transfers players
Cleveland Chase Brassmen players
Cleveland Rebels players
College of Wooster alumni
Forwards (basketball)
Guards (basketball)
High school basketball coaches in Ohio
High school football coaches in Ohio
Providence Steamrollers players
Sportspeople from Cleveland